Futian Checkpoint station is a terminus of Line 4 and Line 10 of the Shenzhen Metro. Line 4 platforms opened on 28 June 2007 and Line 10 platforms on 18 August 2020. It is located at the ground level of Futian Port Control Point in Futian District, Shenzhen, People's Republic of China, and it is the only ground station in Shenzhen Metro. Futian Port Control Point and Futian Checkpoint Station are connected to Hong Kong's Lok Ma Chau station by a footbridge.

The station was called Huanggang because of its location near Huanggang, which is also an immigration control point between Shenzhen and Hong Kong. It was renamed to Futiankouan on 15 August 2008 to avoid confusion between Futian Port and Huanggang Port. "Kouan" means a (immigration) port. Starting from 1 July 2010, with MTR Corporation (Shenzhen) taking over the operations and management of Line 4, the English name Futian Checkpoint is now used. A station called Huanggang Checkpoint opened at Huanggang Port in 2016.

Station layout
There are a total of 5 levels in the Futian Checkpoint station. The 2nd and 3rd levels (above ground) are immigration facilities (being the arrivals hall and departures hall respectively), while the 1st level is Line 4 concourse. The 2 side platforms and an island platform are located on the basement 1st level, but only one island platform and 1 side platform is used in daily operations. Among them, the side platform serves as the unloading platform for trains arriving at the station, while the other island platform is used as the boarding platform for trains departing the station. This method is called the Spanish solution. Line 10 concourse is also located on the basement 1st level, but the transfer passage between Line 4 and Line 10 is under construction. Passengers need to out-of-station interchange Line 4. The basement 3rd level is Line 10 platforms.

Exits

See also 
 Futian Port Control Point
 Lok Ma Chau station

References

External links

Railway stations in Guangdong
Shenzhen Metro stations
Futian District
Railway stations in China opened in 2007